Assyriska Föreningen i Norrköping, abbreviated Assyriska IF, was a Swedish football club located in Norrköping.

They merged with IK Derik and Azech SF to form ADAS United in 2021.

Background
Assyriska IF were founded in 1977 to serve the Assyrian community in Norrköping.  Today there are players, officials and supporters of several different nationalities, not just the Assyrians.

Since their foundation Assyriska IF has participated mainly in the middle and lower divisions of the Swedish football league system.  The club currently plays in Division 2 Södra Svealand which is the fourth tier of Swedish football. They play their home matches at the Mamre IP in Norrköping.

Assyriska IF are affiliated to the Östergötlands Fotbollförbund.

Season to season

Attendances

In recent seasons Assyriska Föreningen i Norrköping have had the following average attendances:

See also
List of Assyrian-Syriac football teams in Sweden

Footnotes

External links
 Assyriska Föreningen i Norrköping – Official website
 Assyriska IF Norrköping Facebook

Sport in Norrköping
Assyrian football clubs
Association football clubs established in 1977
Association football clubs disestablished in 2021
Assyrian/Syriac football clubs in Sweden
1977 establishments in Sweden
2021 disestablishments in Sweden
Diaspora sports clubs
Defunct football clubs in Sweden